The Belfast Jewish Community (and previously known as Belfast Hebrew Congregation) is the Jewish community in Belfast, Northern Ireland. Its Rabbi is the Rev David Kale. The community follows the Ashkenazi Orthodox ritual. Membership has fluctuated from 78 in 1900, approximately 1500 during World War II, about 375 after World War II, to 350 in 1945, 380 in 1949 and 200 in 1999.  The congregation was fewer than 80 people .

History
Established in 1870, the congregation's first two "ministers" (rabbis) were Reverend Joseph Chotzner (serving from 1870 to 1880 and 1892 to 1897) and Rev. Jacob Myers. M. A. Jaffe (father of Otto Jaffe), who came to Ireland in 1851, was instrumental in founding the synagogue. Later, the position was filled by Rabbi Yitzhak HaLevi Herzog (1916–1919), who later become Chief Rabbi of Ireland and Israel, and Rabbi Jacob Shachter (translator of Zvi Hirsch Chajes), 1926–1954.

Elizabeth Jane Caulfield, the Countess of Charlemont, regularly attended the synagogue and apparently converted to Judaism there.

Otto Jaffe, Lord Mayor of Belfast, was life-president of the Belfast Hebrew Congregation, which worshipped at the Great Victoria Street synagogue.

Buildings
Currently located on Somerton Road, the congregation previously had the synagogue building on Annesley Street (1904–1964) and Great Victoria Street (1871–1904). (The foundation stones were dated 7 July 1871 and 26 February 1904.)

The synagogue, designed by Eugene Rosenberg,  is unusual in that it is circular, not rectangular. There is no balcony for women, but a raised platform on either side. The roof is held up by concrete-covered beams that forms the shape of a Star of David. The candelabrum and eternal light, together with bronze and silver letters adorning the Ark doors, are by Israeli sculptor, Nehemia Azaz.

The synagogue has a plaque in memory of Jews killed during the Holocaust. Listed in the UK National Inventory of War Memorials, the English part of the inscription reads: "In memory of the martyred millions of European Jewry 1933–1945."

See also
History of the Jews in Northern Ireland

References

Further reading

 On Rabbi Jacob Shachter (1886–1971) of Romania and Manchester UK, see this biography at Yashar Books.

External links
Official website
Belfast Hebrew Congregation on Jewish Communities and Records – UK (hosted by jewishgen.org).
McKevitt, Greg: "150 years of Belfast's Jewish community", BBC News, 27 January 2015

1870 establishments in Ireland
1870 establishments in the United Kingdom
Ashkenazi Jewish culture in Ireland
Ashkenazi Jewish culture in the United Kingdom
Ashkenazi synagogues
Jews and Judaism in Northern Ireland
Belfast
Orthodox synagogues in the United Kingdom
Religious buildings and structures in Belfast
Synagogues in Northern Ireland